Brighton Rock may refer to:

Brighton Rock (novel), a 1938 novel by Graham Greene
Brighton Rock (play), a 1943 stage adaptation by Frank Harvey
Brighton Rock (1948 film), a 1948 film based on the novel, directed by John Boulting
Brighton Rock (musical), a 2004 musical by John Barry and Don Black, based on the novel
Brighton Rock (2010 film), a 2010 film also based on the novel
Brighton Rock (band), a Canadian glam metal band
Brighton Rock (EP), a 1985 EP by Brighton Rock
"Brighton Rock" (song), a 1974 song by Queen on the album Sheer Heart Attack
Rock (confectionery), a candy often referred to by its place of origin, for instance "Blackpool rock" or "Brighton rock"

See also
New Brighton Rock, a 1984 rock concert staged in New Brighton, Merseyside, UK